Sanka Purna (born 3 March 1998) is a Sri Lankan cricketer. He made his List A debut on 3 April 2021, for Ace Capital Cricket Club in the 2020–21 Major Clubs Limited Over Tournament.

References

External links
 

1998 births
Living people
Sri Lankan cricketers
Sri Lanka Ports Authority Cricket Club cricketers
Place of birth missing (living people)